Harras Vilhelm Johannes Kyttä (25 June 1912, Helsinki – 12 March 1985) was a Finnish jurist and politician. He served as Minister of the Interior from 27 May to 2 September 1957 and again from 26 April to 29 August 1958. Kyttä was a Member of the Parliament of Finland from 1951 to 1964, representing the People's Party of Finland.

References

1912 births
1985 deaths
Politicians from Helsinki
People from Uusimaa Province (Grand Duchy of Finland)
People's Party of Finland (1951) politicians
Government ministers of Finland
Members of the Parliament of Finland (1951–54)
Members of the Parliament of Finland (1954–58)
Members of the Parliament of Finland (1958–62)
Members of the Parliament of Finland (1962–66)
University of Helsinki alumni